MSU Faculty of Psychology is a faculty of the Moscow State University, which was established in 1966 and headed by Aleksey Leontyev until his death in 1979. At various times, a number of researchers have worked at the Faculty, such as Sergei Rubinshtein, Alexei Nikolaevich Leont'ev, Alexander Luria, Eugene Sokolov, Chingis Izmailov, Gal'perin, Bluma Zeigarnik, and Daniil El'konin.

External links 
  Official site of the Faculty

Psychology, Faculty of
Education in Moscow
Psychology education